Sound Prints (subtitled Live at Monterey Jazz Festival) is a live album by trumpeter Dave Douglas and saxophonist Joe Lovano recorded at the 2013 Monterey Jazz Festival. It was released on the Blue Note label in 2015 and features a live performance by Douglas and Lovano with pianist Lawrence Fields, bassist Linda Oh and drummer Joey Baron playing original material and two new compositions by Wayne Shorter.

Reception

Allmusic awarded the album 4 stars, stating: "Ultimately, Sound Prints walk the line between muscular, tangible post-bop and free-flowing, avant-garde playing; a tantalizing dance that never fails to leave an impression". In JazzTimes, Michael J. West wrote "the real meat of the recording, and of the band, is their interplay: harmony, counterpoint, call-and-response. It’s not what one might expect from a project inspired by Wayne Shorter. But Sound Prints is less about Shorter’s individual style than his audacity and innovation, and on those fronts Live triumphs".

Track listing
 "Sound Prints" (Joe Lovano) - 4:38
 "Sprints" (Dave Douglas) - 13:58
 "Destination Unknown" (Wayne Shorter) - 8:32
 "To Sail Beyond the Sunset" (Shorter) - 10:25
 "Weatherman" (Lovano) - 1:34
 "Power Ranger" (Douglas) - 12:45

Personnel
Dave Douglas - trumpet
Joe Lovano - tenor saxophone
Lawrence Fields - piano
Linda Oh - bass
Joey Baron - drums

References

Joe Lovano live albums
Dave Douglas (trumpeter) live albums
2015 live albums
Blue Note Records live albums
Albums recorded at the Monterey Jazz Festival